A list of films produced in Egypt in 1949. For an A-Z list of films currently on Wikipedia, see :Category:Egyptian films.

External links
 Egyptian films of 1949 at the Internet Movie Database
 Egyptian films of 1949 elCinema.com

Lists of Egyptian films by year
1949 in Egypt
Lists of 1949 films by country or language